Aang Witarsa (8 December 1930 – 8 August 1998) was an Indonesian footballer. He competed in the men's tournament at the 1956 Summer Olympics.

References

External links
 

1930 births
1998 deaths
Indonesian footballers
Indonesia international footballers
Olympic footballers of Indonesia
Footballers at the 1956 Summer Olympics
Place of birth missing
Association football forwards